Ri Il-jin (리일진; born 20 August 1993) is a North Korean footballer who plays as a midfielder.

References 

Living people
1993 births
2019 AFC Asian Cup players
North Korean footballers
North Korea international footballers
Association football midfielders